The South Africa national beach soccer team represents South Africa in international beach soccer competitions and is controlled by the SAFA, the governing body for football in South Africa.

Current squad
Correct as of July 2008

 

Coach: Shezi Lindani

Current Staff
Head Delegation: Zola Dunywa

Achievements
FIFA Beach Soccer World Cup Best: Twelfth place
1999, 2005
CAF Beach Soccer Championship Best: Fourth place
2007

External links
 BSWW Profile

Beach Soccer
African national beach soccer teams